The Daladerini are a tribe of leaf-footed bugs, in the subfamily Coreinae erected by Carl Stål in 1873.  Genera are distributed from Africa to South-East Asia.

Genera 
The Coreoidea Species File lists:
 Brachytes Westwood, 1842
 Dalader Amyot & Serville, 1843
 Daladeropsis Karsch, 1894
 Elasmogaster Stål, 1854
 Hormambogaster Karsch, 1892
 Kerzhnercryptes Brailovsky, 2002
 Odontocurtus Brailovsky, 2011
 Odontorhopala Stål, 1873
 Parabrachytes Distant, 1879
 Rhombolaparus Bergroth, 1906

References

External links
 
 

Hemiptera tribes
Coreinae